Inkd is an online print and design sales service developed by Kelly Smith of Curious Office and the venture capital firm Second Avenue Partners in Seattle, Washington. The company is a user-generated marketplace that provides the general public with a way to buy and sell print designs.

The site follows in the tradition of a user-generated content marketplace, in that they provide graphic designers with free personal storefronts where they list their designs for sale in an attempt to earn commissions. Businesses are able to download the contributed brochure and business card templates in a variety of file types for use in popular design and publishing applications.

History 
Inkd was conceived of and developed by Curious Office and Second Avenue Partners and is one of several companies in their portfolio.  Inkd was capitalized with a $1.7 million Series A venture round on September 23, 2008 by Second Avenue, Rich Barton, and Mika Salmi.

Kelly Smith developed the initial concept, which mirrored another company he co-founded called Imagekind with Adrian Hanauer. Imagekind was the first online marketplace to buy and sell art prints. It was subsequently sold to CafePress in 2008.

Founded in 2009, under the name Pressplane, Inkd launched with an estimated 800 original designs and has since grown to nearly 2000 template designs. The model allows users to preview and download designs, and customize them once they have completed the purchase. Most print designs are primarily available in vector graphics programs such as Adobe Systems, InDesign, and Illustrator, but the site also accepts submissions and offers templates for download in other formats such as Apple iWork and Microsoft Word.

References

External links

Curious Office
Second Avenue Partners

Internet properties established in 2009
Online marketplaces of the United States
Companies based in Seattle
2009 establishments in Washington (state)
Software companies based in Seattle